Mill Road Cemetery  is a Commonwealth War Graves Commission burial ground for the dead of World War I situated  near the French town of Thiepval.

The cemetery was established as a battlefield cemetery for troops killed in the Battle of the Somme. Battlefield clearances of the surrounding area in 1919 significantly increased the size of the cemetery. The cemetery was extended after the Armistice with graves brought in from the battlefields of Beaumont-Hamel and Thiepval and from the smaller Division Road Cemeteries No. 1 and No. 3 and St Pierre-Divion Cemetery No. 2

The cemetery now contains the graves of 1304 Commonwealth soldiers, 815 of which are unidentified. The cemetery was designed by Sir Herbert Baker.

External links
 
 

Commonwealth War Graves Commission cemeteries in France
Battle of the Somme
1917 establishments in France
Cemeteries in Somme (department)
World War I cemeteries in France